Kimberly Metz is an American film director, fashion, beauty, celebrity and advertising photographer based in Los Angeles, syndicated by Corbis Outline and Corbis Beauty.
Metz grew up in Pismo Beach and North Hollywood, California. 
At the age of 16, she received a Pentax camera as a gift from her father and began modeling and acting at 19. 

After a decade as a fashion model and a Screen Actors Guild actress, appearing in a Pringles commercial, a Sprite commercial, working in places such as Milan, Paris, New York City, London, and various other countries, Metz returned to her creative roots and passion behind the lens.

By combining her industry knowledge and experience from modeling and love for photography, Metz started her photography career in 1998. Metz found recognition when she photographed Arnold Schwarzenegger for the cover of Cowboys and Indians and Oscar winner Jamie Foxx and Jada Pinkett Smith for the cover of Upscale Magazine in 2004.

Photography

Metz's photography has been featured in the New York Post, Forbes, Essence, Hamptons, Viva Magazine, LA Yoga, The Chew, People, L.A. Confidential Magazine, Modern Luxury Angeleno, Nail Pro Magazine, Pure Dope, Ripetv as well as junior and miss designers, advertising and stills for BET America, DVD and book covers. She has won two Maggie awards for her 2001 cover of Weider Publications and her 2004 cover and celebrity feature of Instinct (magazine). Kimberly shot a 2016 Brawny campaign for international women's day. Kimberly also donated her services to Flashes of Hope.

She has shot numerous celebrities, musicians, and athletes, including Alexandra Daddario, Ajiona Alexus, Alaina Huffman, Alex Greenwald, Amaury Nolasco, Antonio Sabàto Jr., Brooke Burns, Bryan Batt, Celine Dion, Coby Bell, Corrinna Everson, Cedric The Entertainer,Christopher McDonald, Chrissy Teigen, Claudia Jordan, Victoria Pratt, Josh Holloway, Julianne Hough, Giorgio A. Tsoukalos, Jamie Chung, Meta Golding, Lisa Dergan, Eric Winter, Susan Sarandon, Wolfgang Puck, Patrick Faucette, Moon Bloodgood, Nikki Ziering, Esai Morales, Willie Nelson, Kendrick Lamar, Rosario Dawson, Bill Maher, John Legend, Roselyn Sanchez, Malin Åkerman, Kim Glass, Jeanene Fox, Rick Fox, Monet Mazur, Pooch Hall, Regina King, Rob Minkoff, Renee Felice Smith, Swin Cash, Warren G, Tyson Beckford, Robert Horry, D.L. Hughley, Tyler Lepley, Tom Green, Shaggy, Cheryl Hines, Bryan Callen, John Savage (actor), Paul Ben-Victor, Victor Webster, Elisabeth Röhm, April Kae, Sierra McClain, Stacy Keibler, Kim Kardashian, Bryan Cranston, Juliette Lewis, Kenya Kinski-Jones, Lisa Rinna, Niki Taylor, Nik West, Oliver Hudson, Marcus Allen, J-Roc, Eric Winter, Rolan Bolan, Kim Basinger, Mena Suvari, Skylar Stecker, Robert Carradine, Denise Richards, and Z Berg.

She has also appeared on camera for Bravo as a judge and photographer for Manhunt, as well as a photo expert on TLC's Faking It.

Film

In 2012, Metz directed for the American Red Cross PSA campaign commercial for disaster relief featuring Elisabeth Röhm

In 2013, Metz directed a music video for "We Found Love" by recording artist Vaja

In 2015, Metz directed nine tutorial videos for Physician's Formula. Four of which are currently available on the Physician's Formula website.

In 2015, Metz directed and shot the commercial for Moroccan Heritage with Iman Oubou.

In 2016, Metz directed and shot the Last Chance for Animals   PSA commercial featuring Kenya Kinski-Jones

In 2017, Metz directed and shot the Last Chance for Animals PSA commercial featuring Mena Suvari

In 2021, Metz directed and shot the Last Chance for Animals PSA commercial featuring Kim Basinger

Articles

Fifth Avenue Article on Kimberly Metz

Viva Magazine: About The Photographer

Kimberly Metz Photo Shoot Video

References

External links
 http://kimberlymetz.com/
 http://www.linkedin.com/in/kimberlymetzphotographer
 https://vimeo.com/user17842758
 https://www.imdb.com/name/nm1752380/
 http://www.famegame.com/people/Kimberly_Metz

Living people
American photographers
People from Pismo Beach, California
Year of birth missing (living people)